Patrick Gerrard Howell (born March 12, 1957) is a former American college and professional football player who was an offensive lineman in the National Football League (NFL) for seven seasons during the late 1970s and 1980s.  Howell played college football at the University of Southern California, and was recognized as an All-American.  A second-round pick in the 1979 NFL Draft, he played professionally for the Atlanta Falcons and Houston Oilers of the NFL.

Early years
Howell was born in Fresno, California.  He was a Parade magazine high school All-American for Fresno High School football team in 1974, and Central California Valley discus throw champion in track and field.

College career
Howell attended the University of Southern California, where he played for the USC Trojans football team.  As a senior in 1978, he received consensus first-team All-American honors.

Professional career

Football family
His son, Nick Howell, was an offensive lineman for the USC Trojans, after playing football at Bullard High School in Fresno, California.

References

1957 births
Living people
All-American college football players
American football offensive linemen
Atlanta Falcons players
Houston Oilers players
Sportspeople from Fresno, California
USC Trojans football players
Ed Block Courage Award recipients